Caesaropapism  is the idea of combining the social and political power of secular government with religious power, or of making secular authority superior to the spiritual authority of the Church; especially concerning the connection of the Church with government. Although Justus Henning Böhmer (1674–1749) may have originally coined the term caesaropapism (Cäseropapismus), it was Max Weber (1864–1920) who wrote that "a secular, caesaropapist ruler... exercises supreme authority in ecclesiastic matters by virtue of his autonomous legitimacy." According to Weber, caesaropapism entails "the complete subordination of priests to secular power."

In an extreme form, caesaropapism is where the head of state, notably the emperor ("Caesar", by extension a "superior" king), is also the supreme head of the church (pope or analogous religious leader). In this form, caesaropapism inverts theocracy (or hierocracy in Weber), in which institutions of the church control the state. Both caesaropapism and theocracy are systems in which there is no separation of church and state and in which the two form parts of a single power-structure.

Eastern Church

Caesaropapism's chief example is the authority that the Byzantine (East Roman) Emperors had over the Church of Constantinople and Eastern Christianity from the 330 consecration of Constantinople through the tenth century. The Byzantine Emperor would typically protect the Eastern Church and manage its administration by presiding over ecumenical councils and appointing Patriarchs and setting territorial boundaries for their jurisdiction.  The Emperor exercised a strong control over the ecclesiastical hierarchy, and the Patriarch of Constantinople could not hold office if he did not have the Emperor's approval. Such Emperors as Basiliscus, Zeno, Justinian I, Heraclius, and Constans II published several strictly ecclesiastical edicts either on their own without the mediation of church councils, or they exercised their own political influence on the councils to issue the edicts. According to Metropolitan Kallistos Ware, the historical reality of caesaropapism stems from the confusion of the Byzantine Empire with the Kingdom of God and the zeal of the Byzantines "to establish here on earth a living icon of God's government in heaven."

However, Caesaropapism "never became an accepted principle in Byzantium." Several Eastern churchmen such as John Chrysostom, Patriarch of Constantinople and Athanasius, Patriarch of Alexandria, strongly opposed imperial control over the Church, as did Western theologians like Hilary of Poitiers and Hosius, Bishop of Córdoba. Saints, such as Maximus the Confessor, resisted the imperial power as a consequence of their witness to orthodoxy. In addition, at several occasions imperial decrees had to be withdrawn as the people of the Church, both lay people, monks and priests, refused to accept inventions at variance with the Church's customs and beliefs. These events show that power over the Church really was in the hands of the Church itself – not solely with the emperor.

During a speech at the St. Procopius Unionistic Congress in 1959, Fr. John Dvornik stated, "...the attitude of all Orthodox Churches toward the State, especially the Russian Church is dictated by a very old tradition which has its roots in early Christian political philosophy... the Christian Emperor was regarded as the representative of God in the Christian commonwealth, whose duty was to watch not only over the material, but also the spiritual welfare of his Christian subjects. Because of that, his interference in Church affairs was regarded as his duty."

Following the Fall of Constantinople in 1453, the Sultans of the Ottoman Empire took control of appointing the Patriarch of Constantinople and all Byzantine Rite Bishops within their dominions. According to historian Charles A. Frazee, the Greek Hierarchs appointed by the Sultan and his advisors were almost invariably opposed to the reunification decrees at the Council of Florence and rejected the authority of the Papacy.

At the same time, however, so great was the suffering of the Greek people under the Sultans that, in the February 14, 1908 Papal allocution Ringraziamo Vivamente, Pope Pius X accused the Greek Orthodox Church under Turkish rule of having preferred, "a harsh yoke (that of Islam) to the tenderness of their mother."

Caesaropapism was most notorious in the Tsardom of Russia when Ivan IV the Terrible assumed the title Czar in 1547 and subordinated the Russian Orthodox Church to the state. In defiance of the Tsar's absolute power, St. Philip, the Metropolitan of Moscow, preached sermons in Tsar Ivan's presence that condemned his indiscriminate use of state terror against real and imagined traitors and their families by the Oprichnina. Metropolitan Philip also withheld the traditional blessing of the Tsar during the Divine Liturgy. In response, the Tsar convened a Church Council, whose bishops obediently declared Metropolitan Philip deposed on false charges of moral offenses and imprisoned him in a monastery. When the former Metropolitan refused a request from the Tsar to bless the 1570 Massacre of Novgorod, the Tsar allegedly sent Malyuta Skuratov to smother the former Bishop inside his cell. Metropolitan Philip was canonized in 1636 and is still commemorated within the Orthodox Church as a, "pillar of orthodoxy, fighter for the truth, shepherd who laid down his life for his flock."

Tsar Ivan's level of caesaropapism far exceeded that of the Byzantine Empire but was taken to a new level in 1721, when Peter the Great and Theophan Prokopovich, as part of their Church reforms, replaced the Patriarch of Moscow with a department of the civil service headed by an Ober-Procurator and called the Most Holy Synod, which oversaw the running of the church as an extension of the Tsar's government.

During the reign of Tsar Nicholas II of Russia, Orthodox Hieromonks who wanted to be bishops would routinely send bribes and other expensive gifts to Most Holy Synod officials, Gregory Rasputin, and other favorites of the Imperial Family.

The Patriarchate was only restored on November 10 (October 28 O.S.), 1917, 3 days after the Bolshevik Revolution, by decision of the All-Russian Local Council.

Seeking to convince Soviet authorities to stop the campaign of terror and persecution against the Church, Metropolitan Sergius, acting as patriarchal locum tenens, tried to look for ways of peaceful reconciliation with the government. On July 29, 1927, he issued : an encyclical letter where he professed the absolute loyalty of the Russian Orthodox Church to the Soviet Union and to its government's interests.

This declaration, sparked an immediate controversy among the Russian Eastern Orthodox, many of whom (including many notable and respected bishops in prisons and exile) broke communion with Sergius. This attitude of submission to the Soviet Government is sometimes derogatorily called "Sergianism", after Met. Sergius and his declaration, and is to this day deemed by some Eastern Orthodox Christians, especially True Orthodox, as a heresy.

Later, some of these bishops reconciled with Sergius, but many still remained in opposition to the "official Church" until the election of Patriarch Alexius I in 1945.

Western Church

Justinian I conquered the Italian peninsula in the Gothic War (535–554) and appointed the next three popes, a practice that would be continued by his successors and later be delegated to the Exarchate of Ravenna. The Byzantine Papacy was a period of Byzantine domination of the papacy from 537 to 752, when popes required the approval of the Byzantine Emperor for episcopal consecration, and many popes were chosen from the apocrisiarii (liaisons from the pope to the emperor) or the inhabitants of Byzantine Greece, Byzantine Syria, or Byzantine Sicily.

Anglican Communion

During the dispute between Henry VIII and Pope Clement VII over Henry's wish to have his marriage to Catherine of Aragon annulled, the English Parliament passed the Act in Restraint of Appeals (1533). It stated

The next year Parliament passed the  First Act of Supremacy (1534) that explicitly tied the head of church to the imperial crown:

The Crown of Ireland Act, passed by the Irish Parliament in 1541 (effective 1542), changed the traditional title used by the Monarchs of England for the reign over Ireland, from Lord of Ireland to King of Ireland and naming Henry head of the Church of Ireland, for similar reasons.

During the reign of Mary I, the First Act of Supremacy was annulled, but during the reign of Elizabeth I the Second Act of Supremacy, with similar wording to the First Act, was passed in 1559. During the English Interregnum the laws were annulled, but the acts which caused the laws to be in abeyance were themselves deemed to be null and void by the Parliaments of the English Restoration.

When Elizabeth I restored royal supremacy, she replaced the title "Supreme Head" with that of "Supreme Governor", a conciliatory change to moderate English Catholics and Protestants. 

According to Fr. Nicholas Sanders, however, "The Queen lays down for her clergy a rule of life, outside of which they dare not move, not only in those things which Protestants call indifferent, but in all matters of Faith, discipline, and doctrine, in virtue of that supreme spiritual power with which she is invested: she suspends her bishops when she pleases, she grants a license to preach, either to those who are ordained according to her rite or to simple laymen, in the same way at her pleasure reduces those whom she will to silence. To show her authority in these things, she occasionally, from her closet, addresses her preacher, and interrupts him in the presence of a large congregation, in some such way as this: 'Mr. Doctor, you are wandering from the text, and talking nonsense. Return to your subject.'"

Since then, the monarchs of England, of Great Britain, and of the United Kingdom have claimed the "Supreme Governor" status as well as the title of Defender of the Faith (which was originally bestowed on Henry VIII by Pope Leo X but later revoked by Pope Paul III, as that was originally an award for Henry VIII's Defence of the Seven Sacraments).

Despite his continued persecution of both Catholic Recusants and English Dissenters, King James I preferred not to do anything else that might otherwise encourage factional strife within the Anglican Communion. His son and heir, King Charles I, through his insistence upon promoting the High Church reforms advocated by the Caroline Divines and by Archbishop William Laud, alienated opponents of Anglo-Catholicism and lost both his throne and his head at the end of the English Civil War.

The 1688 overthrow of the House of Stuart was caused by the efforts of King James II to partially annul the Act of Supremacy by granting Catholic Emancipation more than two hundred years before Daniel O'Connell. As this was seen by many Anglicans as a violation of the King's Coronation Oath, Parliament blocked every bill, which caused the King to simply order Catholic Emancipation into effect using his Royal Prerogative. In response, Parliament successfully invited the King's son in law, William of Orange to invade England and take the throne.

Even though King James II and his exiled heirs remained Catholics, their overthrow divided the Anglican Communion in what is now known as the Non-juring schism. Anglican Jacobites, or Non-Jurors, embraced the Anglo-Catholicism advanced by the Stuart monarchs since the reign of James I. During every one of the Jacobite risings, Non-Juring Anglican chaplains accompanied the Jacobite armies. The schism ended only following the 1788 death of Prince Charles Edward Stuart and the inheritance of his claim to the throne by his younger brother, Prince Henry Benedict Stuart, a Roman Catholic priest and Cardinal.

Since 1948, the Church Commissioners have been charged with administering the Church of England and recommending potential Bishops to Her Majesty's Government.

In popular culture
 The Investiture Controversy between King John of the House of Plantagenet and Pope Innocent III, who is represented onstage by Cardinal Pandulf Verraccio, over both the appointment of Archbishop Stephen Langton to the Diocese of Canterbury and Crown vs. Vatican control over the English Church is a major plotline of the play The Life and Death of King John by William Shakespeare.
 The alleged careerism and subservience of Anglican clergy to multiple contradictory religious beliefs imposed upon their denomination by different English monarchs is satirized in the 17th-century ballad The Vicar of Bray.
 The conflict between Tsar Ivan the Terrible and Metropolitan Philip is shown onscreen in Sergei Eisenstein's 1944 film Ivan the Terrible.
 Robert Bolt's play A Man for All Seasons centers around the efforts of King Henry VIII and Thomas Cromwell to coerce the former Lord Chancellor of England, Sir Thomas More, to express approval of the King's claim to control the Catholic Church in England and Wales. The play has seen multiple revivals and was made into a multi–Academy Award–winning 1966 feature film starring Paul Scofield and a 1988 television movie starring Charlton Heston.
 In the BBC sitcom Yes, Prime Minister, the episode "The Bishop's Gambit", which first aired on 20 February 1986, satirizes the damage that the control wielded over the Church of England by politicians and the British civil service continues to have on who gets appointed to the Hierarchy.
 The conflict between Tsar Ivan the Terrible and Metropolitan Philip is the primary theme of Pavel Lungin's 2009 film Tsar.

See also

Communism
 Chinese Patriotic Catholic Association
 Liberation Theology
 Patriarch Alexy I of Moscow
 Renovationism
 Three-Self Patriotic Movement

Fascism
 German Christians (movement)
 German Evangelical Church
 Relationship between the Romanian Orthodox Church and the Iron Guard

Monarchism

 Avignon Papacy
 Byzantinism
 Christianity and politics
 Church and state in medieval Europe
 Concordat of Worms
 Constantinian shift
 Erastianism
 Gallicanism
 Great Apostasy
 Guelphs and Ghibellines
 Joseph of Volotsk
 Massacre of Thessalonica
 Political Catholicism
 Priest hunter
 Richard Topcliffe
 Roman State religion
 Robert Barnes
 State church of the Roman Empire
 Syllabus of Errors (Pope Pius IX, 1864)
 Temporal power (papal)
 William Tyndale

Opposition to Caesaropapism

 Alexander Men
 Alexander Solzhenitsyn
 Bartholomew Remov
 Brownist
 Catacomb Church
 Confessing Church
 Dictatus papae (Pope Gregory VII, 1075)
 Dietrich Bonhoeffer
 English Dissenters
 Forty Martyrs of England and Wales
 Gleb Yakunin
 Gregorian Reform
 House church (China)
 Investiture Controversy
 Irish Martyrs
 John Fisher
 Joseph (Petrovykh)
 London Underground Church
 Mass rocks
 Pilgrim (Plymouth Colony)
 Radical Pietism
 Richard Gwyn
 Russian Greek Catholic Church
 Russian Orthodox Church Outside of Russia
 Søren Kierkegaard
 Symphonia (theology)
 Theocracy
 Tikhon of Moscow
 Thomas Becket
 Thomas More
 Underground church

References

 Attribution
  (not fully exploited)

External links 
 

Caesaropapism
Catholic ecclesiology
Christianity and government
Christianity and political ideologies
Christian terminology
Confessionalism
Eastern Orthodoxy-related controversies
Ecclesiology
History of Eastern Christianity
Political theories